The Guil is a  long river in the Hautes-Alpes département, southeastern France. Its source is several small streams which converge into the lake Lestio, at Ristolas. It flows generally west, through the Queyras. It is a left tributary of the Durance into which it flows at Guillestre.

Communes along its course
This list is ordered from source to mouth: Ristolas, Abriès, Aiguilles, Château-Ville-Vieille, Arvieux, Eygliers, Guillestre

References

Rivers of France
Rivers of Hautes-Alpes
Rivers of Provence-Alpes-Côte d'Azur
Rivers of the Alps